Georgi Dimitrov (June 18, 1882 – July 2, 1949) was a Bulgarian communist politician. He was the first communist leader of Bulgaria, from 1946 to 1949. Dimitrov led the Comintern (Communist International) under Stalin from 1934 to 1943. He was a theorist of capitalism who expanded Lenin's ideas by arguing that fascism was the dictatorship of the most reactionary elements of financial capitalism.

This is a Georgi Dimitrov bibliography, including writings, speeches, letters and others.

Writings 

This is a list of selected writings:

Speeches

See also 

 Marxist bibliography

References

External links 
 Georgi Dimitrov at the Marxists Internet Archive

Dimitrov, Georgi
Communist books